Ramsey Angela (born 6 November 1999) is a Dutch athlete from Rotterdam, representing PAC Rotterdam and the Dutch national team. With the Dutch team he became European Champion at the 2021 European Athletics Indoor Championships in the 4 × 400 metres relay event. He is openly gay.

References

External links

World Athletics Bio

Dutch male hurdlers
Dutch male sprinters
1999 births
Living people
Athletes from Rotterdam
Dutch people of Curaçao descent
Gay sportsmen
Dutch LGBT sportspeople
Dutch gay men
LGBT track and field athletes
Athletes (track and field) at the 2020 Summer Olympics
Medalists at the 2020 Summer Olympics
Olympic silver medalists in athletics (track and field)
Olympic silver medalists for the Netherlands
Olympic athletes of the Netherlands
20th-century Dutch LGBT people
21st-century Dutch LGBT people